Epacteriscidae is a family of copepods belonging to the order Calanoida.

Genera

Genera:
 Azygonectes Fosshagen & Iliffe, 2004 
 Balinella Fosshagen, Boxshall & Iliffe, 2001 
 Bofuriella Fosshagen, Boxshall & Iliffe, 2001

References

Copepods